Nancy Allen may refer to:

Nancy Allen (actress) (born 1950), American actress and cancer activist
Nancy Allen (harpist) (born 1954), American harpist

See also
Nancy Allan (born 1952), Manitoban politician
Allen (surname)